is a Japanese manga series written by Looseboy and illustrated by Iori Furuya. It has been serialized in Square Enix's shōnen manga magazine Monthly Shōnen Gangan since May 2016 and has been collected in ten tankōbon volumes. The manga is published digitally in North America by Crunchyroll. An anime television series adaptation by Bridge aired from October to December 2020.

Plot
In the near future, mysterious monsters known as the "Enemies of Humanity" begin to appear, and with it so do children with supernatural powers called the "Talented". To prepare them for the upcoming battle against these Enemies, all the Talented are sent to a school located on a deserted island, where they have all their daily needs provided for until they graduate and communication with the outside world is forbidden. One day, a new student named Nana Hiiragi arrives at the school. Her friendly and cheerful personality lets her quickly make friends with the class. In reality, however, Nana is a Talentless government assassin who has been dispatched to kill the Talented, whom the government deems to be the true Enemies of Humanity.

Characters

One of the newest students on the island. She claims to have the talent of mind-reading and possesses a very affable and extroverted personality that lets her make friends easily. In reality, she is a Talentless assassin sent by the government to quietly eliminate all of her classmates. Nana's true persona is one that is incredibly skilled, intelligent, and observant, utilizing deductive reasoning and social engineering techniques to maintain her facade and evade suspicion. 

A timid boy from a wealthy family who feels pressured by his father to become a leader wherever he goes. At first, he is seen as a Talentless student and the initial protagonist, but later reveals his talent is the ability to cancel out the effects of other talents by touching them.

 
A mysterious transfer student who arrived in school the same time as Nana, with the talent of immortality. Although he has an overbearing demeanor and prefers to keep to himself, he wishes to make friends and is a bit of an otaku. Like Nana, he is extremely observant and quick to uptake, but his deductive skills fall a step behind hers. He begins suspecting her involvement in the students' deaths and investigating the truth behind the Enemies of Humanity after his younger sister arrived at the same island and disappeared five years prior.

 
A kind girl whom Nana often thinks resembles a puppy. She has the talent to heal others by licking their wounds, but cannot cure illnesses and the drawback of her talent is that it shortens her lifespan quickly. Her naive nature leads her to trust Nana wholeheartedly. 

An arrogant and perfectionistic student who cares deeply about propriety and dreams of using his talent to change history. He can travel up to 24 hours into the past from a certain spot, although its drawback is that he can only do so if he is not perceived by others, at which point he teleports back into the present. In addition, the longer the jump back in time he makes, the more energy he uses.

 
The class bully with the talent of pyrokinesis. Despite being loud, aggressive and self-centered, he worries for his henchmen and fellow classmates.

A student who is one of Moguo's henchmen.

A student who is one of Moguo's henchmen.

 
A student who is one of Moguo's henchmen. He has the talent to have out-of-body experiences, with his spirit freely able to detach itself from his body and interact with objects, although this leaves his body defenseless. 

 
A flamboyant and flirty student with the talent of cryokinesis.

 
A gyaru who likes to bully Michiru. She is Kaori's best friend and her talent gives her poisonous saliva, although she must consume frogs and snakes regularly to maintain this. 

 
A gyaru who likes to bully Michiru. She is Kirara's best friend and her talent allows her to teleport within a certain distance. 

A laid-back and perverted student who can project his prophetic visions while he is sleeping via a normal camera. 

A friendly and tomboyish girl who claims to have the talent of super strength. She and Shinji are inseparable childhood friends who appear to be dating. 

A pale and brusque boy who has the talent of necromancy. He and Yūka are inseparable childhood friends who appear to be dating.

A good-natured and popular student who is Fūko's boyfriend. 

A mild-mannered girl who is Ryūji's girlfriend. She has the talent to manipulate air currents and control air pressure, including using wind as razor-sharp blades, but can only do so in a well-ventilated area. 

 
He is the homeroom teacher of the students. Despite being a teacher, he is virtually clueless of the government's actions.

A powerful Talented who is a former student at the island. His talent allows him to transform into any living creature and even use their talents, provided his transformation is not seen by other people.

Media

Manga
Talentless Nana is written by Looseboy and illustrated by Iori Furuya. The series began serialization in Square Enix's shōnen manga magazine Monthly Shōnen Gangan on May 12, 2016. As of October 2022, it has been collected in ten tankōbon volumes. The series is published digitally in North America by Crunchyroll.

Volume list

Anime
An anime television series adaptation was announced on April 7, 2020. The series was animated by Bridge and directed by Shinji Ishihira, with Fumihiko Shimo handling series composition, Satohiko Sano designing the characters, and Yasuharu Takanashi composing the music at Nippon Columbia. The opening theme, "Broken Sky", is performed by Miyu Tomita, while the ending theme, is performed by Chiai Fujikawa. The series aired from October 4 to December 27, 2020 on AT-X, Tokyo MX, SUN, and TVA. Muse Communication licensed the anime and they streamed it in Southeast Asia and South Asia. 

Funimation acquired the series and streamed it on its website in North America and the British Isles. On November 20, 2021, Funimation announced the series would receive an English dub, which premiered the following day. Following Sony's acquisition of Crunchyroll, the series was moved to Crunchyroll.

Episode list

Notes

References

External links
Talentless Nana at Monthly Shōnen Gangan 
 
Talentless Nana at Crunchyroll Manga

Anime series based on manga
AT-X (TV network) original programming
Bridge (studio)
Crunchyroll anime
Crunchyroll manga
Fiction about assassinations
Gangan Comics manga
Muse Communication
Psychological thriller anime and manga
School life in anime and manga
Shōnen manga
Square Enix franchises
Suspense anime and manga
Works about fictional serial killers